Mangaldai; also spelt Mangaldoi is a small town in the Indian state of Assam. It was named after Mangaldahi, who was the daughter of the Rajah of Darrang and was married to Susenghphaa, (also Pratap Singha),  a ruler of the Ahom kingdom. Mangaldoi serves as the administrative headquarters of Darrang district. The town is located about 70 km East of the Guwahati, capital city of Assam.Many public shopping malls like Bazaar India, Reliance Trends, Bazaar Kolkata,Peter England and much more upcoming international and national marketing chains are upcoming in and around the town

Geography

Situated at the north bank of Brahmaputra river, the city is approximately 68  km from Guwahati and 94.1  km from Tezpur.

Demographics
 India census, Mangaldoi had a population of 36,993 (including Gerimari). Males constituted 52% of the population and females 48%. Mangaldoi had an average literacy rate of 92.57%, higher than the national average of 74.04%: male literacy was 94.95%, and female literacy was 90.09%. In Mangaldoi, 11% of the population was below 6 years of age. The population is largely heterogeneous consisting Assamese, Bengali, Marwadi, Bihari, Punjabi communities. The town has a Hindu majority.

Language

Assamese is the most spoken language at 21,161 speakers, followed by Bengali at 3,767 and Hindi at 614.

Education
Assam Skill University located in Mangaldai. It has a good number of schools and colleges, including Mangaldai Commerce College , Mangaldai College ,Sankardev Sishu Niketan, Don Bosco High School, North East Academy, Maharishi Vidya Mandir, Kendriya Vidyalaya Mangaldai, Mangaldai Govt H S School , Mangaldai B. Ed. College,. Other newly established schools are Gurukul Group of Educational Wing, Jack and Jill English School,Jnan Vikash Academy, Gyan Sagar Academy, Ranjit Sarma Academy and Brilliant Academy.

Governance
Mangaldoi is part of Mangaldoi (Lok Sabha constituency).

Basanta Das of Indian National Congress is the present MLA of Mangaldoi. Dilip Saikia of Bharatiya Janata Party is the present MP of Mangaldoi.

References

External links

Cities and towns in Darrang district